is a multi-use stadium in Kitakami, Iwate, Japan. It is used mostly for track and field events. The stadium holds 22,000 people.

Past events 
1999 Inter-high Games opening ceremony
2016 National Sports Festival of Japan opening ceremony

References

External links
 

Football venues in Japan
Athletics (track and field) venues in Japan
Iwate Grulla Morioka
Sports venues in Iwate Prefecture
Sports venues completed in 1997
1997 establishments in Japan
Kitakami, Iwate